Leiostyla gibba  is a species of small, air-breathing land snail, a terrestrial pulmonate gastropod mollusk in the family Lauriidae. This species is mentioned in Annexes II and IV of the Habitats Directive. It is one of several species sometimes referred as Madeiran land snail.

Leiostyla gibba is listed as Critically Endangered in the 2011 IUCN Red List, but now may possibly be extinct.

Distribution
This species was endemic to Madeira, Portugal.

References

External links 
 Council of Europe. (1996). Background Information on Invertebrates of the Habitats Directive, volume 3. page 454-456.

Leiostyla
Taxa named by Richard Thomas Lowe
Gastropods described in 1852
Taxonomy articles created by Polbot